Dash Aghol (also Romanized as Dāsh Āghol and Dāsh Āghel; also known as  Dāsh Āghūl) is a village in Dul Rural District, in the Central District of Urmia County, West Azerbaijan Province, Iran. At the 2006 census, its population was 104, in 39 families.

References 

Populated places in Urmia County